The 26th Genie Awards were held on March 13, 2006 to honour films released in 2005. The ceremony was held at The Carlu theatre in Toronto. The ceremony was hosted by Lisa Ray and Terry David Mulligan.

Nominees and winners
The Genie Award winner in each category is shown in bold text.

References

26
Genie
Genie